Walking on Cars was a four-piece Irish rock band, whose 2020 line-up consisted of Pa Sheehy (singer/lyricist), Sorcha Durham (pianist), Paul Flannery (bass guitarist) and Evan Hadnett (drummer). Their debut single "Catch Me If You Can", released in 2012, went to No. 1 on the Irish iTunes chart. The band released their debut EP, As We Fly South, in 2013, and a second one, Hand in Hand, in (2014), together with the accompanying single "Always Be with You". Their next single, "Speeding Cars", came out on 30 October 2015. Following the international success of the single, the band released their debut album Everything This Way on 29 January 2016, which peaked at No. 1 in Ireland. On 12 April 2019, the band released their second album Colours.

The band announced its split on 21 August 2020, on the same date that a final six-track EP called Clouds was released.

History

Formation and early years
In 2010, five school friends started performing at local venues and clubs in their hometown of Dingle, County Kerry. Committing wholly to their musical ambitions, the band went on to rent a house in the Dingle Peninsula and lock themselves away for the purpose of writing and recording demos. "The place we rented was a really old cottage, where we had no television, no phone, no Internet, no transport," says Sorcha, "We were there for 6 months – just our equipment and us. It was an amazing time, ideas were constantly flowing."

In 2012, Walking on Cars won the Redbull Bedroom Jam competition and gained extensive radio play with their debut single "Catch Me If You Can". As a result, the track reached no. 27 in the Irish Charts, where it remained for over 20 weeks. "Catch Me If You Can" also reached No.1 on iTunes, and garnered over 450,000 views on YouTube. "Two Stones", the band's second single, reached No.12 in the Irish charts, while YouTube views exceeded 1,000,000.

Walking on Cars released their four-song EP, As We Fly South, in 2013. It was recorded in Attica Studios, Donegal, and produced by Tom McFall (R.E.M, Snow Patrol, Bloc Party, Editors). In July 2014, the band released "Hand in Hand" and "Always Be With You".

Chart success
In 2016, they released their first full-length album, Everything This Way, celebrating the release with CD signings and in-store performances around Ireland. The album went "double platinum" and reached number one on the album charts in Ireland, as well as charting in several other European countries.

In 2020, the band's single, "Monster", was used as the opening theme of the Netflix original series, The Stranger. The eight part miniseries, based on the novel by Harlan Coben, first aired on 30 January 2020.

Split and later projects
In August 2020, coinciding with the release of an EP titled Clouds, the band announced that they had split.

In 2021, the former lead-singer of the band, Pa Sheehy, undertook a number of solo projects. His debut single, "Saw you at a funeral", was released in June 2021 with a follow up single "Roisin" released in August 2021.

Band members
Former members
 Pa Sheehy – lead vocals, piano, guitar  (2010–2020)
 Sorcha Durham – piano, vocals (2010–2020)
 Paul Flannery – bass, vocals (2010–2020)
 Evan Hadnett – drums, percussion (2010–2020)
 Dan Devane - guitar (2010–Feb 2018)

Timeline

Discography

Studio albums

EPs

Singles

Music videos

References

External links

Irish indie pop groups
Irish indie rock groups
Irish alternative rock groups
Musical groups established in 2010
Musical groups disestablished in 2020
Musical quintets
EMI Records artists
2010 establishments in Ireland